Neil Young: Silver & Gold is a live video by Neil Young performing solo on acoustic guitar and piano. All but the last song were performed at Austin, Texas' Bass Concert Hall during his 1999 solo acoustic tour.

Track listing
 "Intro"
 "Looking Forward"
 "Out of Control"
 "Buffalo Springfield Again"
 "Philadelphia"
 "Daddy Went Walkin'"
 "Distant Camera"
 "Red Sun"
 "Long May You Run"
 "Harvest Moon"
 "The Great Divide"
 "Slowpoke"
 "Good to See You"
 "Silver & Gold"

References

2000 video albums
Live video albums
Neil Young albums
2000 live albums
Albums produced by Larry Johnson (film producer)
Warner Records live albums
Warner Records video albums
Reprise Records video albums
Reprise Records live albums